David Levien (born December 9, 1967) is an American screenwriter, director, producer, and novelist. He is co-creator, executive producer, and showrunner of Showtime's Billions, along with Brian Koppelman. Over the past two decades Levien has created an influential and diverse body of work in both film and television. Some of his most noteworthy credits include Ocean's Thirteen, Rounders, Solitary Man, The Illusionist, Runaway Jury, Tilt, and ESPN's 30 for 30 (This Is What They Want) for which he won a sports Emmy.

Levien is also the author of six novels, including four in the celebrated Frank Behr series.  Some of his earlier works were published under D.J. Levien.

Early life and education 
Levien was born in Great Neck, New York. He met his lifelong writing partner and friend, Brian Koppelman, on a summer bus trip for teens when Levien was 14 years old. Levien is Jewish. He is a graduate of the University of Michigan. After school he moved to Los Angeles where he worked as a story editor for various agencies and production companies. Finding that editing the stories of the others impacted his writing, he quit and moved to Paris and then Argentina where he trained horses before returning to New York City where he reunited with Koppelman.

Career

Film 
In 1997, Levien wrote the original screenplay for Rounders with his writing partner, Brian Koppelman. In 2001, Levien and Koppelman wrote, produced, and directed the film Knockaround Guys, which film critic Roger Ebert gave 3 out of 4 stars. Levien and Koppelman also co-wrote the 2003 film Runaway Jury, which was nominated for the Edgar Award for Best Screenplay. In 2009, Levien and Koppelman co-directed Solitary Man starring Michael Douglas. The film was included in both A.O. Scott's The New York Times "Year End Best" list and Roger Ebert's "Year End Best" list. Other film credits include the third installment in the Ocean's franchise, 2007's Ocean's Thirteen, directed by Steven Soderbergh.

Novels 
Levien has published six novels, including the literary novels Wormwood, Swagbelly, and the popular Frank Behr crime series, set in the midwest and chronicling the fictional private investigator. The series includes City of the Sun, Where the Dead Lay, 13 Million Dollar Pop, and Signature Kill. The Behr books were nominated for the Hammett, Barry and Shamus awards. Sons of Spade named 13 Million Dollar Pop the best P.I. novel of 2011.

Short stories 
In 2015, Levien published the short story "Knock Out Whist," which was nominated by Best American Mystery Stories 2016 as an honorable mention. His story "Einstein's Sabbath" was published in The Darkling Halls of Ivy anthology in 2020.

Television 
Showtime's drama series, Billions, created by David Levien, Brian Koppelman, and Andrew Ross Sorkin, and starring Paul Giamatti and Damian Lewis, premiered to strong reviews in 2016. The show is now in its fifth season and was renewed for a sixth in 2020.

Filmography

Films

Producer only
 Interview with the Assassin (2002)
 The Illusionist  (2006)
 The Lucky Ones (2007)
 I Smile Back (2015)

Television

Novels

Frank Behr novels
 City of the Sun (2008)
 Where the Dead Lay  (2009)
 Thirteen Million Dollar Pop (2011); released as The Contract outside the US (2012)
 Signature Kill (2014)

Standalone novels
 Wormwood (1999)
 Swagbelly: A Novel for Today's Gentleman (2003)

Short stories 
 "Knock-out Whist" (2015)
"Einstein's Sabbath" (2020)

References

External links
 
 Author listing for David Levien on goodreads.com
 Bio of David Levien

Living people
American male screenwriters
Jewish American screenwriters
University of Michigan alumni
1967 births
21st-century American Jews